"That's All There Is to That" is a song written by Clyde Otis and Kelly Owens and performed by Nat King Cole featuring The Four Knights.  It reached #15 on the U.S. R&B chart and #16 on the U.S. pop chart in 1956.  The song reference's Ethel Barrymore's phrase to rebuff curtain calls, "That's all there is, there isn't any more".

The single's B-side, "My Dream Sonata" reached #59 on the U.S. pop chart in 1956.

Other versions
Dinah Shore released a version of the song as the B-side to her 1955 single "Stolen Love".
Dinah Washington released a version of the song on her 1959 album What a Diff'rence a Day Makes!
Etta Jones released a version of the song as a single in 1962, but it did not chart.
Hank Thompson and His Brazos Valley Boys released a version of the song on their 1965 album Breakin' in Another Heart.

References

1956 songs
1956 singles
1962 singles
Songs written by Clyde Otis
Nat King Cole songs
Dinah Shore songs
Dinah Washington songs
Hank Thompson (musician) songs
Capitol Records singles